The U.S. Congressional International Conservation Caucus, founded in September 2003, is a bipartisan congressional organization with the conviction that “the United States of America has the opportunity, the obligation and the interests to advance the conservation of natural resources for this and future generations,” and a commitment to promote U.S. leadership in public/private conservation partnerships worldwide.

These partnerships are supported in order to ensure stewardship for natural resources that can lead to habitat and biodiversity protection, poverty alleviation, economic development and regional safety.  The ICC constitutes the second largest bipartisan congressional caucus, with over 1/3 of the U.S. House of Representatives, and over 1/4 of the U.S. Senate as acting members.

History
A popular social movement in the late 1800s pushed conservation of natural resources to the top of the national agenda. The leaders of the movement were concerned that poor land management would put long-term national interests at risk, as well as destroy future Americans' natural heritage. Under President Theodore Roosevelt, the United States placed 230,000,000 acres of land under national protection to conserve natural assets for the long-term use of future generations.

A new wave of conservationism emerged in the early 21st century inspired by America's history of sound natural resource management; they were united by the conviction that the United States of America should take steps to export these practices throughout the world, helping strengthen national security. 

The International Conservation Caucus was founded in September 2003 by Representatives Clay Shaw (R-FL), John Tanner (D-TN), Ed Royce (R-CA), and Tom Udall (D-NM) to preserve the influence and motivation needed to provide continual support to critical conservation projects.

Guiding principles
 All actions must be grounded in respect for the sovereignty, cultures, and traditions of the nations in which programs are implemented.
 Careful account must be given to local community concerns and needs.
 Sound science is fundamental to designing effective conservation strategies.
 Protected areas are a cornerstone of successful and sustainable conservation.
 Conservation should be linked with efforts to promote good governance, strengthen rule of law, reduce poverty, encourage economic development, nurture democratic institutions, advance education, and improve public health.
 Conservation requires collaboration among governments, civil society organizations, the private sector, international institutions, and others.

117th Congress

House

Co-Chairs 
 Henry Cuellar (D-TX)
 David P. Joyce (R-OH)
Betty McCollum (D-MN)

Members

Senate

Co-Chairs 
 Richard Burr (R-NC) Retiring at end of 117th Congress.
Chris Coons (D-DE)
Rob Portman (R-OH) Retiring at end of 117th Congress.
Sheldon Whitehouse (D-RI)

Members

Former co-chairs

Former House Chairs
 Ben Chandler (D-KY)
 Ander Crenshaw (R-FL)
 Norm Dicks (D-WA)
 Hal Rogers (R-KY)
 Clay Shaw (R-FL)(ret.)
 John Tanner (D-TN)
 Jim Moran (D-VA)

Former Senate Chairs
 Sam Brownback (R-KS)
 Richard Burr (R-NC)
 Dick Durbin (D-IL)
 Robert Portman (R-OH)
 Olympia Snowe (R-ME)
 Tom Udall (D-NM)
 Sheldon Whitehouse (D-RI)

See also
 Conservation in the United States
 International Conservation Caucus Foundation

References

External links
 U.S. House of RepresentativesInternational Conservation Caucus, U.S. House of Representatives International Conservation Caucus
 International Conservation Caucus Foundation International Conservation Caucus Foundation
 About the B & C Club Boone and Crockett Club

Caucuses of the United States Congress